Chiri is a village in Rohtak district of Haryana, India. According to 2011 Census of India population of the village is 9,735. The village is ruled by Gram Panchayat.

References

Villages in Rohtak district